Angels' Alley is a 1948 American comedy film directed by William Beaudine.

Angels' Alley, Angel's Alley, or Angels' Ally may also refer to:

Angel Alley, a location associated with the Marshalsea prison (1373–1842), Southwark, England
Angel Alley,  the location of the Advisory Service for Squatters, London
Angel Alley, a  1973 LP by a post-Mandrake Memorial trio Anomaly

See also
The Ballad of Angel's Alley
Angel Street (disambiguation)